Hlevakha is an urban-type settlement in Fastiv Raion of Kyiv Oblast (region) of Ukraine. It hosts the administration of Hlevakha settlement hromada, one of the hromadas of Ukraine. Population: .

Until 18 July 2020, Hlevakha belonged to Vasylkiv Raion. The raion was abolished that day as part of the administrative reform of Ukraine, which reduced the number of raions of Kyiv Oblast to seven. The area of Vasylkiv Raion was split between Bila Tserkva, Fastiv, and Obukhiv Raions, with Hlevakha being transferred to Fastiv Raion.

Hlevakha is situated 10,5 km. to the south of Kyiv. There are a lot of dachas in this settlement.

References

Urban-type settlements in Fastiv Raion
Kyiv metropolitan area